Vellberg is a town in the district of Schwäbisch Hall, in Baden-Württemberg, Germany. It is located 10 km east of Schwäbisch Hall, and 15 km southwest of Crailsheim.

Gallery

References

Schwäbisch Hall (district)